United Alive in Madrid is a live album released in 2019 by the German power metal band Helloween. The recordings took place during the band's Pumpkins United World Tour (2017–2018), with former members Michael Kiske and Kai Hansen joining Helloween's line-up. The main concert was recorded on 9 December 2017 at the WiZink Centre in Madrid, Spain and the bonus tracks in Chile, Brazil, Czech Republic and Germany.

The video release United Alive came out on the same day as the live album and contained concert footage filmed during 2017 in Spain and Brazil and during 2018 in Wacken Open Air Festival (Germany). Extra material included bonus concert tracks filmed in Brazil, Czech Republic and Chile, a band interview, as well as LED content and animations shown during the shows.

Track listing

Disc one

Disc two

Disc three (bonus tracks)

Track 1 recorded at Santiago, Chile, 31 October 2018
Track 2 recorded at Prague, Czech Republic, 25 November 2017
Track 3 recorded at São Paulo, Brazil, 29 October 2017
Track 4 recorded at Wacken Open Air Festival, Germany, 4 August 2018

Personnel
 Michael Kiske – vocals
 Andi Deris – vocals
 Kai Hansen – guitars, vocals
 Michael Weikath – guitars
 Sascha Gerstner – guitars
 Markus Grosskopf – bass
 Daniel Löble – drums

Charts

Album

Video

References

External links
 Album information from Helloween's official website

Helloween albums
2019 live albums